4-Deoxypyridoxine is a vitamin B6 antagonist. It may be toxic to developing embryos since it can have negative effects on collagen and elastin during development. The presence of this compound can produce vitamin B6 deficiency, which suppresses the immune system. This immunosuppression can be beneficial in animal models of Trichinella spiralis infections. 4-Deoxypyridoxine has also been described as an inhibitor of sphingosine-1-phosphate lyase.

References

External links

Immunosuppressants
Hydroxypyridines
Primary alcohols
Vitamin B6 antagonists